The 12th Moscow International Film Festival was held from 7 to 21 July 1981. The Golden Prizes were awarded to the Brazilian film O Homem que Virou Suco directed by João Batista de Andrade, the Vietnamese film The Abandoned Field: Free Fire Zone directed by Nguyen Hong Shen and the Soviet-French-Swiss film Teheran 43 directed by Aleksandr Alov and Vladimir Naumov.

Jury
 Stanislav Rostotsky (USSR – President of the Jury)
 Juan Antonio Bardem (Spain)
 Basu Bhattacharya (India)
 Jerzy Hoffman (Poland)
 Jacques Duqeau-Rupp (France)
 Bata Živojinović (Yugoslavia)
 Komaki Kurihara (Japan)
 Jay Leyda (USA)
 Miguel Littín (Chile)
 László Lugossy (Hungary)
 Nelson Pereira dos Santos (Brazil)
 Gian Luigi Rondi (Italy)
 Olzhas Suleimenov (USSR)
 Med Hondo (Mauritania)
 Lyudmila Chursina (USSR)

Films in competition
The following films were selected for the main competition:

Awards
 Golden Prizes:
 O Homem que Virou Suco by João Batista de Andrade
 The Abandoned Field: Free Fire Zone by Nguyen Hong Shen
 Teheran 43 by Aleksandr Alov, Vladimir Naumov
 Silver Prizes:
 Temporary Paradise by András Kovács
 Belønningen by Bjørn Lien
 Muddy River by Kōhei Oguri
 Special Prizes:
 Ali in Wonderland by Ahmed Rachedi
 Yo Ho Ho by Zako Heskiya
 Ta chvíle, ten okamžik by Jiří Sequens
 Peacetime in Paris by Predrag Golubović
 Prizes:
 Best Actor: Karl Merkatz for Der Bockerer
 Best Actor: Tito Junco for Guardafronteras
 Best Actor: Roman Wilhelmi for The Moth
 Best Actress: Mercedes Sampietro for Gary Cooper, Who Art in Heaven
 Best Actress: Maya-Gozel Aimedova for Tree Dzhamal
 Special Diplomas:
 The Man with the Carnation by Nikos Tzimas
 El caso Huayanay by Federico García
 Morning Undersea by Lauro António
 The Pale Light of Sorrow by Iulian Mihu
 Night by the Seashore by Erkko Kivikoski
 Diploma:
 Young Actor: Viktor Chouchkov for Yo Ho Ho
 Prix FIPRESCI: The Abandoned Field: Free Fire Zone by Nguyen Hong Shen

References

External links
Moscow International Film Festival: 1981 at Internet Movie Database

1981
1981 film festivals
1981 in the Soviet Union
1981 in Moscow